Robert Andrew Ackerman (born September 19, 1956) is an American director, producer, and script editor who is best known for his work on Seinfeld, The New Adventures of Old Christine and the HBO series Curb Your Enthusiasm.

Early life and education
Ackerman was born in Los Angeles, California. His father Robert was a lithographer, and his mother Rosemary was a substitute teacher and homemaker. He was raised in Glendale. He attended Loyola High School in Los Angeles before graduating from Santa Clara University in 1978 with a degree in general humanities.

Career
Ackerman began his career as a videotape editor on WKRP in Cincinnati (1979–82) and Newhart, winning an Emmy for the former. He also was an assistant editor on Welcome Back, Kotter. He replaced Tom Cherones as director of Seinfeld starting in its sixth season, ultimately directing 89 episodes. 

Ackerman directed every episode of The New Adventures of Old Christine, and has directed or guest directed such series as Everybody Loves Raymond, Becker, Cheers, Wings, Frasier, Two and a Half Men, Andy Richter Controls the Universe, Perfect Couples, Whitney and The Ellen Show. He also directed the pilot episode of the 2006 Fox series Happy Hour.

Ackerman has received 15 Primetime Emmy Awards nominations, winning three.

Personal life
Ackerman is a Catholic. He and his wife Betsy, also a Santa Clara University graduate, are the parents of four children.

Filmography

References

External links
 
 

American television directors
Living people
Television producers from California
1956 births
People from Los Angeles
Santa Clara University alumni
Directors Guild of America Award winners